Collaborator or collaborators may refer to:

 Collaboration, working with others for a common goal
 Collaborationism, working with an enemy occupier against one's own country
Collaboration with the Axis Powers during World War II

Books
 Collaborators (play), a 2011 British play
 Collaborator (novel), a 2003 alternate history novel by Murray Davies
The Collaborator, by S. L. Stebel 1968
The Collaborator, by Gerald Seymour 2011
The Collaborator (Mirza Waheed novel) 2011
The Collaborator, by Margaret Leroy 2011

Film and television
 Collaborator (film), a 2011 comedy-drama film written and directed by Martin Donovan
 The Collaborators (film), a 2015 independent British film
 "Collaborators" (Battlestar Galactica)
 "The Collaborator" (Star Trek: Deep Space Nine), a 1994 second-season episode of Star Trek: Deep Space Nine
 "Collaborators" (Mad Men), season 6/episode 3 of Mad Men
 The Collaborators (TV series), a Canadian police television drama

Other uses
Collaborator (album), a 1994 album by Djam Karet 
 Collaborator (software), an enterprise-grade software tool for development teams conducting peer code reviews

See also
Collaboration (disambiguation)
 Collaborative learning
 Collaborative method